Laccophilus hyalinus is a species of beetle belonging to the family Dytiscidae.

It is native to Europe.

References

Dytiscidae
Beetles described in 1774